In international relations, a concession is a "synallagmatic act by which a State transfers the exercise of rights or functions proper to itself to a foreign private test which, in turn, participates in the performance of public functions and thus gains a privileged position vis-a-vis other private law subjects within the jurisdiction of the State concerned." International concessions are not defined in international law and do not generally fall under it. Rather, they are governed by the municipal law of the conceding state. There may, however, be a law of succession for such concessions, whereby the concession is continued even when the conceding state ceases to exist.

In international law, a lease is "an arrangement whereby territory is leased or pledged by the owner-State to another State. In such cases, sovereignty is, for the term of the lease, transferred to the lessee State." The term "international lease" is sometimes also used to describe any leasing of property by one state to another or to a foreign national, but the normal leasing of property, as in diplomatic premises, is governed by municipal, not international, law. Sometimes the term "quasi-international lease" is used for leases between states when less than full sovereignty over a territory is involved. A true international lease, or "political" lease, involves the transfer of sovereignty for a specified period of time. Although they may have the same character as cessions, the terminability of such leases is now fully accepted.

American  concessions 
Guantanamo Bay: leased from Cuba (which now disputes the lease) under 1903 and 1934 treaties in perpetuity; no civilian administration, only military command.
Panama Canal Zone: US Territory in Panama obtained under the Hay–Bunau-Varilla Treaty in 1903. Returned to full Panaminian control in 1999 after the signing of the Torrijos–Carter Treaties in 1977. 
Thule Air Base: a concession granted to the United States rent free by Denmark in perpetuity pursuant to the 1951 Greenland Defense Agreement which provides that the United States shall have exclusive jurisdiction over the area in question.
Two in imperial China:
1848/54 American concession in Shanghai (since 17 November 1843 a Treaty Port) established, until on 21 September 1863 (after the 1862 Proposal to make Shanghai an independent "free city" was rejected) an International Settlement in Shanghai was created by union of the American and British concessions (consummated December 1863).
 American concession of Tianjin (Tientsin).
The numerous cemeteries and monuments administered by the American Battle Monuments Commission.  These are located in Belgium, Cuba, France, Gibraltar, Italy, Luxembourg, Mexico, Morocco, the Netherlands, Panama, Papua New Guinea, the Philippines, the Solomon Islands, South Korea, Tunisia, and the United Kingdom.  The most popular sites among these are the Normandy American Cemetery and Memorial in France and the John F. Kennedy Memorial at Runnymede, United Kingdom.

Austro-Hungarian concession holders
The Austro-Hungarian concession of Tianjin (Tientsin), in China (1901–1917). Officially surrendered by Austria in 1919 (Treaty of Saint-Germain) and Hungary in 1920 respectively (Treaty of Trianon).

Belgian concession holders 
 The Guatemalan parliament issued a decree on 4 May 1843 by virtue of which the district of Santo Tomas was given "in perpetuity" to the Compagnie belge de colonisation, a private Belgian company under the protection of King Leopold I. Belgian colonizing efforts ceased after a few years, due to the lack of financial means and the harsh climate.
 The Lado enclave, in the Anglo-Egyptian Sudan, leased to the Congo Free State (not a part of Belgium itself, but in a personal union with Belgium under King Leopold II) (1894–1910)
 Belgian concession of Tianjin (Tientsin) (1902–1931)

British concession holders

Held by the United Kingdom 
 On 9 June 1898, the New Territories (comprising areas north of Kowloon along with 230 small islands) were leased from China for 99 years as a leased territory under the Convention for the Extension of Hong Kong Territory. On 19 December 1984, the UK agreed to restore all of Hong Kong—including the territories ceded in perpetuity—to China on 1 July 1997. 
 On 20 November 1846, a British concession in Shanghai (in China) was established (after the 16 June 1842 – 29 August 1842 British occupation of Shanghai, since 17 November 1843 a Treaty Port); on 27 November 1848, this concession was expanded, but on 21 September 1863 (after the 1862 proposal to make Shanghai an independent "free city" was rejected) an International Settlement in Shanghai was created by union of the American and British concessions (consummated in December 1863). 
It was held on a lease in perpetuity granted by the Chinese government to the British Crown, which sublet plots to private owners in the same way as at Hankou (Hankow). The local management was entrusted to a municipal council organized on lines similar to those at Shanghai.
 The British concession on the Shamian Island (Shameen Island) in Guangzhou (Canton).

See also
 Treaty Ports (Ireland)

Privately held
Tati Concessions Land 1872–1911, in a small part of present Botswana, detached from the Matabele kingdom.

Canadian concessions
Following the First World War the French Republic granted Canada perpetual use of a portion of land on Vimy Ridge under the understanding that the Canadians were to use the land to establish a battlefield park and memorial. The park, known as the Canadian National Vimy Memorial, contains an impressive monument to the fallen, a museum and extensive re-creations of the wartime trench system, preserved tunnels and cemeteries.

Chinese concessions
Between 1882 and 1884, the Qing Empire obtained concessions in Korea at Incheon, Busan and Wonsan. The concessions were occupied by Japan in 1894 after the outbreak of the First Sino-Japanese War. After China's defeat in that war, Korea (now with Japanese support) declared the unequal treaties with Qing China to be void, and unilaterally withdrew the extraterritoriality and other powers granted to China in respect of the concessions. The concessions were formally abolished in 1898.

French concessions
The French concession in Shanghai was established on 6 April 1849 (it had been a Treaty Port since 17 November 1843). On 17 July 1854 a Municipal Council established. The concession was relinquished by Vichy France to a Japan-sponsored puppet government in China, and was formally returned to China by France in 1946. 
French concession of Tianjin (1860-1946)
French concession of Hankou (Hankow; 1898–1946; now part of Wuhan)
The French concession on the Shamian Island (Shameen Island) in Guangzhou (Canton) (1861-1946)

Finnish concessions
Saimaa Canal: leased from Russia   under 1963 and 2010 treaties in period of 50 years;  civilian and commercial administration

German concessions
All in China:
On 6 March 1898, Qingdao (Tsingtao) was leased "for 99 years" to Germany (Kiautschou Bay concession); it was already occupied by Germany since 14 November 1897. On 23 August 1914, Republic of China canceled the German lease. The concession was occupied by Japan on 7 November 1914. 
German concession of Tianjin (Tientsin)
One of the concessions in Hankou (Hankow; now a part of Wuhan)

Italian concession
 The Italian concession of Tianjin (Tientsin) was conceded to the Kingdom of Italy by Qing China on 7 September 1901. It was administered by Italy's Consul and had a population of 6,261 in 1935, including 536 foreigners.
 Several ships of the Italian Royal Navy (Regia Marina) were based at Tianjin. During World War II, the primary Italian vessels based at Tianjin were the minelayer Lepanto and the gunboat Carlotto. 
 On 10 September 1943, the Italian concession at Tianjin was occupied by Japan. In 1943, Italian Fascist dictator Benito Mussolini's (however virtually powerless) Italian Social Republic relinquished the concession to the Japanese-sponsored 'Chinese National Government', a Japanese puppet state led by Wang Jingwei; it was never recognized by the Kingdom of Italy, the Republic of China, or most world governments. On 10 February 1947, by peace treaty, the zone was formally returned to Nationalist China by the Italian Republic.

Japanese concessions
In China:
the Japanese concession of Tianjin (Tientsin).
the only non-Western concession in Hankou (Hankow; today a part of Wuhan).

In Korea (Chosen), before the Annex of Japan-Korea (1910):
Busan
Incheon

Portuguese concession
Macau: around 1552–1553, the Portuguese obtained permission to establish a settlement as a reward for defeating pirates and to mediate in trade between China and Japan and between both nations and Europe; it was leased from the empire of China from 1670. The concession turned into a Portuguese colony in the mid-19th century. The Chinese government assumed sovereignty over Macau on 20 December 1999, ending 329 years of Portuguese colonial rule.

Russian and Soviet concessions
The Russian concession of Tianjin (Tientsin).
one of the concessions of Hankou (Hankow; now part of Wuhan).
Hanko Peninsula, a  peninsula near the Finnish capital Helsinki, was leased for a period of 30 years by the Soviet Union from its northwestern neighbour—and former possession in personal union—Finland for use as a naval base in the Baltic Sea, near the entry of the Gulf of Finland, under the Moscow Peace Treaty that ended the Winter War on 6 March 1940; during the Continuation War, Soviet troops were forced to evacuate Hanko in early December 1941, and the USSR formally renounced the lease—early given the original term until 1970—in the Paris peace treaty of 1947. The role of the Hanko naval base was replaced by Porkkalanniemi another Finnish peninsula, a bit farther east at the Gulf of Finland, in the armistice between Finland and the Soviet Union of 19 September 1944; the Porkkala naval base was returned to Finland in January 1956. In both cases, the Soviets limited themselves to a military command, without any civilian administration.
 Khmeimim Air Base in Syria is leased to the Russian government for a period of 49 years, with the Russian government having extraterritorial jurisdiction over the air base and its personnel.
 Since 2015 after the Donbas and Crimea invasion Russia agreed to lease 300,000 hectares to China for 50 years for $ 449 million US dollars.  The lease can be extended in 2018 if the first stage from 2015 to 2018 was successful. Russia needed the Chinese funds to replace a shortfall caused by western sanctions.  The Transbaikal region borders with China, and the lease agreement  stirred up a maelstrom of controversy and anxiety in Russia. China will send a massive influx of Chinese workers to settle and work in the area.

Jointly held concessions
21 September 1863 (after the 1862 Proposal to make Shanghai an independent "free city" was rejected) an International Settlement in Shanghai was created by union of the American and British concessions (consummated December 1863); in 1896 the concession was expanded. 
On 7 July 1927, a Chinese city government of Greater Shanghai was formally established. 
In January/February 1931, the Japanese occupied the Hongkou District (Hongkew), and on 9 November 1937 the Chinese city of Shanghai, but only on 8 December 1941 would Japanese troops occupy the International Settlement (but not the French concession); it was dissolved by Japan in 1942. 
In February 1943 the settlement is officially abolished by the U.S. and Britain; in September 1945, the last territory is restored to China.
Beijing Legation Quarter: a de facto concession.

United Nations concessions
 UN Headquarters: United Nations headquarters in New York City. Under United States laws in exchange for local police, fire protection, and other services.
 Palace of Nations: United Nations palace/office in Geneva.
 Vienna International Centre: United Nations complex/office in Vienna.
 UN Office in Nairobi: United Nations office in Nairobi. Headquarters of UNEP and UN-Habitat.
 UN offices in Bonn: 19+ United Nations offices in Bonn.
 International Court of Justice: UN-owned court in The Hague.
 International Tribunal for the Law of the Sea: UN-owned tribunal in Hamburg.
 Other UN offices

Foreign concessions in China 

Concessions in Tianjin
Chinese Eastern Railway Zone
Guangzhouwan
Kiautschou Bay
Weihaiwei under British rule
Russian Dalian
Kwantung Leased Territory
Shanghai French Concession
Shanghai International Settlement
British Concession (Shanghai)
American Concession (Shanghai)

See also 
 Chartered companies
 Colonization
 Timeline of national independence

References

Citations

Sources 

WorldStatesmen—also by concession holder—or by country for non-colonial territories

Foreign relations of the Qing dynasty
Colonialism
 
Constitutional state types
Dependent territories
Imperialism